The Men's marathon T50 was a marathon event in athletics at the 1996 Summer Paralympics, for wheelchair athletes. Germany's Heinrich Koeberle defended his marathon title and beat out his rival challenger, the American Bart Dodson. Of the seven starters, three reached the finish line, all of whom won medals as a result.

Results

See also
 Marathon at the Paralympics

References 

Men's marathon T50
1996 marathons
Marathons at the Paralympics
Men's marathons